The 2020 Alabama Republican presidential primary took place in Alabama on March 3, 2020, as one of 14 contests scheduled on Super Tuesday in the 2020 Republican Party presidential primaries for the 2020 United States presidential election. The open primary allocated 50 pledged delegates towards the Republican National Convention, distributed with the "winner take most" system of allocating delegates. This system states that a candidate must receive 20% of the vote to receive any delegates statewide or by congressional district, but only if the winner gets less than 50% of the aggregate vote. Should they receive more than 50% of the vote statewide or by congressional district, it becomes winner-take-all.

Only two candidates ran in this primary: incumbent President Donald Trump, whose sole challenger was former Massachusetts Governor Bill Weld. As typical with primary challenges to incumbent presidents, Trump practically ran unopposed, receiving 96.22% of the vote and all 50 delegates. He also carried every single county and congressional district. Weld received a mere 1.52% of the vote, and uncommitted ballots comprised the remaining 2.27% of the vote.

The election corresponded with the highly competitive Republican primary for the 2020 United States Senate election in Alabama, which likely boosted turnout.

Procedure 
Alabama is one of 14 states holding primaries on March 3, 2020, also known as "Super Tuesday," having joined other southern states on the date after a bill on June 10, 2015, shifted the date.

Delegates had to file a Declaration of Candidacy by November 8, 2019, in which they bind themselves to a presidential candidate. Delegates cannot vote contrary to their pledged vote unless they run either in the congressional district wherein they vote or for the at-large delegation, but not both. National Convention District Alternate delegates may be elected by the Congressional District Committee, while at-large alternates are elected by the Republican Executive Committee.

Voting is expected to take place from 7 a.m. until 7 p.m. There are 21 delegates allocated based on the results in each congressional district. In the open primary, if a candidate receives a majority of the vote or if only one candidate receives 20% or more of the vote, they're awarded all three of the congressional district's delegates. If no candidate does so, the first-place candidate receives 2 district delegates and the second-place candidate receives 1. If no candidate receives over 20% of the vote, the three district delegates are awarded proportionally to each contender. Of the 50 pledged delegates, 3 are allocated to each congressional district, 10 to at-large delegates, and another 3 are allocated to pledged party leaders and elected officials (PLEO delegates). 16 bonus delegates were allocated as Alabama shares a primary date with numerous other states on Super Tuesday.

The 47 pledged delegates Alabama sent to the national convention were joined by 3 pledged PLEO delegates, consisting of the National Committeeman, National Committeewoman, and chairman of the Alabama Republican Party.

Candidates 
The following people filed for the Republican presidential primary and were on the ballot in Alabama:

 Donald Trump
 Bill Weld
There was also the option of casting an uncommitted ballot, which would not be pledged to any candidate.

Fundraising 
According to the Federal Election Commission, between April 1, 2019, and November 23, 2020, Donald Trump raised $5,732,810.44 and Bill Weld raised $3,062.20 from Alabama-based contributors.

Results 
Former Massachusetts Governor Bill Weld challenged incumbent president Donald Trump in the Republican primary in Alabama. Trump received 96.22% of the vote and all 50 delegates, while Weld received only 1.52% of the vote. Uncommitted votes made up the other 2.27%.

Results by county

Results by congressional district

Notes

See also
 2020 Alabama Democratic presidential primary

References 

Republican primary
Alabama Republican
Alabama Republican primaries